Costa Rica participated in the 2010 Summer Youth Olympics in Singapore.

The Costa Rican squad consisted of 5 athletes competing in 5 sports: aquatics (swimming), athletics, fencing, judo and triathlon.

Medalists

Athletics

Boys
Track and Road Events

Fencing

Group Stage

Knock-Out Stage

Judo

Individual

Team

Swimming

Triathlon

Men's

Mixed

References

External links
Competitors List: Costa Rica

Nations at the 2010 Summer Youth Olympics
2010 in Costa Rican sport
Costa Rica at the Youth Olympics